Dzmitry Zinovich (born 29 March 1995) is a Belarusian footballer who plays for Dinamo Brest.

His brother Kirill Zinovich is also a professional footballer.

Honours
Dinamo Brest
Belarusian Cup winner: 2016–17

References

External links

Profile at FC Minsk website

1995 births
Living people
Belarusian footballers
Association football defenders
FC Minsk players
FC Dynamo Brest players
FC Belshina Bobruisk players
FC Isloch Minsk Raion players